Mizuki Sonoda (born 21 November 1996) is a Japanese professional footballer who plays as a midfielder for WE League club Albirex Niigata Ladies.

Club career 
Sonoda made her WE League debut on 12 September 2021.

References 

Living people
1996 births
Women's association football midfielders
WE League players
Japanese women's footballers
Albirex Niigata Ladies players
Association football people from Kyoto Prefecture